Foraire Uladh ar Aodh is an Irish poem by Maol Sheachluinn na n-Uirsgéal Ó hUiginn.

Composed in the early fifteenth century, it is an address to Aodh mac Art Mag Aonghusa, Chief of Uí Echach Cobo. It "... apparently became accepted as a masterpiece in the bardic schools, since it was the model for Eochaidh Ó hÉoghusa's more tongue-in-cheek treatment, Bíodh aire ag Ultaibh ar Aodh.

Mag Aonghusa controlled the Newry Pass, which played an important part in preventing the forces of the Dublin government entering Ulster to contest the rebels of the province; this made him:

"literally the procective sentinel of the province. ...There was some factural basis for the imagery of the tireless watchman, since the Annals give evidence suggesting that during times of open hostility the frontiers of Ireland's small lordships were guarded by horse-patrols to give the inhabitants early warning of approaching cattle-raid.  .. the image of the patron as a vigilant sentilel could be used to evoke a more radical symbolism of the king as cowherd or shepherd (buachaill or aoghaire) of his subjects, standing between them and all perils, natural and supernatural."

References

 Katherine Simms (1990) "Images of Warfare in Bardic Poetry", Celtica 21.
 Katherine Simms (1976) Gaelic lordships in Ulster in the later Middle Ages (Ph.D. thesis, TCD)
 P Harbison (1976) 'native Irish arms and armour in medieval Gaelic literature, 1170-1600', The Irish Sword 12, 173-99
 'Lord Chancellor Gerrard's notes of his report on Ireland', Analecta hibernica 2, (1931) 93-231

Irish literature
Irish poems
Irish texts
Early Irish poetry
Irish-language literature
Medieval poetry
15th-century poems